Wilfred William Shanner (November 4, 1894 – December 18, 1986) was a Major League Baseball pitcher. In one career game, he had a 0–0 record, going four innings, and having a 6.75 ERA. He batted left and threw right-handed.

Shanner was born in Oakland City, Indiana, and died in Evansville, Indiana.

External links
Baseball Reference.com page

1894 births
1986 deaths
Philadelphia Athletics players
Major League Baseball pitchers
Baseball players from Indiana
People from Oakland City, Indiana
Sportspeople from Evansville, Indiana